Chameli may refer to:

 Chameli (film), a 2004 Hindi film directed by Sudhir Mishra
 Chameli (flower), the Hindi name for Jasminum grandiflorum